Ajas is a town located in Bandipora district of the Indian administered union territory of Jammu and Kashmir. The village is located at a distance of 26 kilometres from the district headquarters Bandipore. The village is situated on the banks of the famous and largest freshwater lake of India, the Wular Lake. Its circumference is partly bound by huge mountains and dense green forests. A large stream flows through the village and is called the "Baed Koal".

Demographics
According to the 2011 census of India, Ajas has 1908 households. The literacy rate of Ajas village was 56.88% compared to 67.16% of Jammu and Kashmir. In Ajas, Male literacy stands at 68.91% while the female literacy rate was 44.24%.

Transport

Road
Ajas is connected by road with other places in Jammu and Kashmir and India by the Bandipora-Srinagar Road, Ganderbal-Mansbal Road, etc.

Rail
The nearest railway stations to Ajas are Sopore railway station and Baramulla railway station, located at a distance of 29 and 38 kilometres from Ajas.

Air
The nearest airport is Srinagar International Airport located at a distance of  respectively.

See also
Bandipore
Jammu and Kashmir
Gurez
Bandipora district
Patushay
Wular Lake

References

Villages in Bandipora district